Giorgi Ganugrava (born 21 February 1988 in Tbilisi) is a Georgian footballer. He currently plays for FC Dinamo Batumi.

Ganugrava capped for Georgia in 2006 FIFA World Cup qualification (UEFA), he also played four friendlies in 2005 to 2006, and a non A friendly against Moldova U21.

External links

1988 births
Living people
Footballers from Tbilisi
Footballers from Georgia (country)
Association football midfielders
Georgia (country) international footballers
FC Ameri Tbilisi players
FC Zestafoni players
Czech First League players
FK Mladá Boleslav players
Győri ETO FC players
Lombard-Pápa TFC footballers
Zalaegerszegi TE players
Nemzeti Bajnokság I players
Expatriate footballers from Georgia (country)
Expatriate footballers in the Czech Republic
Expatriate footballers in Hungary
Expatriate sportspeople from Georgia (country) in the Czech Republic
Expatriate sportspeople from Georgia (country) in Hungary
FC Metalurgi Rustavi players
FC Sioni Bolnisi players